Byron Paul Franklin (born September 3, 1958) is a former professional American football wide receiver in the NFL for the Buffalo Bills and Seattle Seahawks.  He played college football at Auburn University.  A native of Sheffield, Alabama, Franklin starred in football at Auburn from 1976–1980 and received a B.S. in vocational and distributive education in 1991.  His professional football career lasted from 1981 to 1987.  He served as assistant director of athletic development at AU from 1991-93.  Appointed to the AU Board of Trustees by Gov. Don Siegelman, Franklin represented the 9th District from 1999 to 2012.  During his term, he chaired the university Student Affairs committee. He now hopes to see success in his 2 youngest children, Bradley Milton Franklin and Brandon Welsey Franklin.

References

1958 births
Living people
Sportspeople from Florence, Alabama
American football wide receivers
Players of American football from Alabama
Auburn Tigers football players
Buffalo Bills players
Seattle Seahawks players